Ectenessa villardi is a species of beetle in the family Cerambycidae. It was described by Belon in 1902.

References

Ectenessini
Beetles described in 1902